Six Compositions: Quartet is an album by American saxophonist and composer Anthony Braxton recorded in 1981 and released on the Antilles label.

Reception

The Allmusic review by Scott Yanow stated: "Braxton seems quite comfortable playing this complex music, and his diagrams (which serve as song titles) are actually fairly humorous."

Track listing
All compositions by Anthony Braxton are graphically titled and the following attempts to translate the title to text.

 "Unpk X [Composition No. 40B]" - 7:09
 "Eggg (Mc- [Composition No. 69N]" - 7:52
 "Pzq M C Wh [Composition No. 34]" - 6:17
 "Dk(Rhx) T U Gil-6 [Composition No. 40A]" - 9:04
 "M R Rjm D [Composition No. 40G]" - 5:00
 "G-Ho Mhh Rwp [Composition No. 52]" - 6:11

Personnel
Anthony Braxton – alto saxophone, tenor saxophone, soprano saxophone, E♭ soprano saxophone, contrabass clarinet
Anthony Davis - piano
Mark Helias - bass
Ed Blackwell - drums

References

Antilles Records albums
Anthony Braxton albums
1982 albums